Heart Surgeons is a 2018 South Korean television series starring Go Soo, Um Ki-joon, and Seo Ji-hye. It aired from September 27 to November 15, 2018 on SBS TV's Wednesdays and Thursdays at 22:00 (KST) time slot for 32 episodes.

Synopsis 
The series revolves around the thoracic surgery department of a hospital.

Cast

Main
 Go Soo as Park Tae-soo, a thoracic surgery fellow for four years whose mother is waiting for a heart transplant.
 Um Ki-joon as Choi Suk-han, a thoracic surgeon who is renowned for his skills but has not been treated fairly due to his humble medical background from a local university.
 Seo Ji-hye as Yoon Soo-yeon, a thoracic surgical assistant. Also the daughter of the director of Taesan hospital, the main setting for this drama.

Supporting
 Kim Ye-won as Ahn Ji-na, a cardiology fellow and Soo-yeon's friend . 
 Jeong Bo-seok as Yoon Hyun-il, Soo-yeon's uncle and the chief of surgery. 
 Nam Kyung-eup as Yoon Hyun-mok, Soo-yeon's father who is a hospital director and a genius pediatric heart surgeon.
 Ahn Nae-sang as Goo Hee-dong
 Jang So-yeon as Kang Eun-sook, a veteran nurse with over twenty years of experience in surgery.
 Choi Dae-hoon as Goo Dong-joon
 Jung Hee-tae as Lee Dae-young  
 Park Kyung-hye as Lee Seon-young
 Lee Jae-won as Nam Woo-jin
 Oh Dong-min as Moon Seung-jae
 Nam Tae-boo as Lee Mi-ran
 Jung Yoo-min as Bae Yoo-ri, a scrub nurse.
 Cha Soon-bae as Lee Joong-do
 Son Kwang-eop as Son Jae-myung
 Jung Hyun-suk as Head Department Yoo
 Lee Duck-hee as Oh Jeong-ae, Tae-soo's mother.
 Jo Jae-yoon as Hwang Jin-cheol
 Seo Ha as Lee Ye-rin

Special appearances
Woo Hyun as Han Sang-wok
Shim Yi-young as Choi Seok-han's wife
Jo Jae-ryong as Hwang Jin-chul
Kim Min-seok as Surgeon (Ep 32)
 Shin Rin-ah as Lee Yoon-Seo

Production
 Writers Choi Soo-jin and Choi Chang-hwan and director Jo Young-kwang previously worked together on the 2017 TV series Innocent Defendant, along with Um Ki-joon as one of the lead stars.
 The first script reading with the cast was held in early August 2018.

Ratings

Awards and nominations

Notes

References

External links
  
 
 

Seoul Broadcasting System television dramas
Korean-language television shows
2018 South Korean television series debuts
2018 South Korean television series endings
South Korean medical television series
Television series by Studio S